Naya Gaun is a village and Village Development Committee in Pyuthan, a Middle Hills district of Lumbini Province, western Nepal.

Etymology

naya - new.
gaun - village.

mandvi gaupalika ward,3

Villages in this ward

References

External links
UN map of VDC boundaries, water features and roads in Pyuthan District

Populated places in Pyuthan District